Rachela Suckewer or Roza Suckewer (1904/1905 – 1943) was a Polish impressionist and expressionist painter, best known for her paintings Social symbol (1930) and Strike on the New York Harbor (1935). She was of Jewish origin. She was a cousin of poet Abraham Sutzkever.

References 

1900s births
1943 deaths
20th-century Polish painters
Polish painters of Jewish descent
Polish women painters
20th-century Polish women artists
Polish Jews who died in the Holocaust
Polish people who died in Treblinka extermination camp